Li Chunyu (Pinyin: Li Chūnyù) (born October 9, 1986, in Shenyang, Liaoning) is a Chinese former professional football player who played as a midfielder.

Club career
Li Chunyu began his professional football career with Chinese Super League club Shenyang Ginde where he would make his league debut against Liaoning Zhongyu on October 31, 2004, in a 3–1 defeat. He would gradually establish himself as regular within the center of their midfield and when the club decided to move to Changsha and rename themselves Changsha Ginde F.C. he would join them. By the 2007 league season he would become an integral member of their team and go on to score his first league goal on March 19, against Shanghai Shenhua in a 1–1 draw.

In January 2010 he moved abroad to Europe to play for Serbian top tier club FK Rad where he would go on to make his league debut on March 14, 2010, against OFK Beograd in a 3–2 defeat. During his time at the club he would receive very little playing time and was released at the end of the season. As a free agent he would transfer to K-League side Gangwon FC in July 2010 and would go on to make his league debut against Ulsan Hyundai on August 7, 2010, in a 2–2 draw. Despite only joining the club halfway through their league campaign he would go on to make seven league appearances by the end of the season.

Li would return to China and signed with Shaanxi Zhongjian Chanba playing in the Chinese Super League, with a club renamed a year later to Guizhou Renhe. His return to China would see him quickly establish himself as a regular with his club and go on to win his first piece of silverware with the 2013 Chinese FA Cup.

On 4 January 2015, Li transferred to fellow Chinese Super League side Shijiazhuang Yongchang. The following season he was unfortunately part of the team that was relegated at the end of the 2016 Chinese Super League season. He would remain with Shijiazhuang within the second tier until they won promotion back into the Chinese top tier when they came  runners-up at the end of the 2019 league campaign.

International career
As a youngster he was part of China national under-17 football team and was considered good enough to take part in the 2003 FIFA U-17 World Championship where he played in all of China's games during the tournament. His time within the Chinese set-up didn't really go much further until he gained regular playing time with Gangwon FC and it was only once he achieved this he was given his senior debut in a friendly against Latvia on November 17, 2010, in a 1–0 victory for China.

Career statistics
Statistics accurate as of match played 31 December 2020.

Honours

Club
Guizhou Renhe
 Chinese FA Cup: 2013
 Chinese FA Super Cup: 2014

References

External sources
 His arrival at FK Rad official site
 Profile at Srbijafudbal
 
 
 
 

1986 births
Living people
Footballers from Shenyang
Association football midfielders
Chinese footballers
China international footballers
Chinese expatriate footballers
Changsha Ginde players
Beijing Renhe F.C. players
FK Rad players
Gangwon FC players
Cangzhou Mighty Lions F.C. players
Chinese Super League players
China League One players
K League 1 players
Serbian SuperLiga players
Expatriate footballers in Serbia
Expatriate footballers in South Korea
Chinese expatriate sportspeople in South Korea